Wakagoi Cup (officially known as Hiroshima aluminum cup Wakagoi Tournament) is a Go competition in Japan. It was open for the members of the Nihon Ki-in. The players must be 6-dan or lower and 30 years of age or younger. The winner's prize was ¥2,000,000. It was founded in 2006. The sponsor is Hiroshima Aluminum Industry Co.,Ltd. Since 2015, the winner's prize is ¥3,000,000.

Past winners

References

Go competitions in Japan